Smart Bomb is the debut EP by Canadian rock band Thrush Hermit, released in 1994 on Murderecords.

Track listing
 Hated It 			  			
 French Inhale 			  			
 All Dressed Up 			  			
 Pink Is the Colour 			  			
 Cott 			  			
 You Got an Answer 			  			
 Radio Blaster

1994 debut EPs
Thrush Hermit albums
Murderecords albums